Bob Graham (born 1936) is an American politician and author.

Bobby or Bob Graham may also refer to

Bob Graham (author/illustrator) (born 1942), Australian author and illustrator
Bob Graham (ice hockey) (born 1947), Canadian retired professional ice hockey player and coach
Bob Graham (New South Wales politician) (born 1943)
Bob Graham (rugby union) (died 2021), New Zealand rugby union player and coach
Bob Graham (Tasmanian politician) (born 1942)
Bob Graham, founder of a UK Charity known as Counsel and Care

See also
Bob Graham Round, the English Lakeland fell-runner
Robert Graham (disambiguation)
Bobby Graham (disambiguation)